The Leeward Antilles are a chain of islands in the Caribbean – specifically the southerly islands of the Lesser Antilles (and, in turn, the Antilles and the West Indies) along the southeastern fringe of the Caribbean Sea, just north of the Venezuelan coast of the South American mainland. The Leeward Antilles, while among the Lesser Antilles, are not to be confused with the Leeward Islands (also of the Lesser Antilles) to the northeast.

Largely lacking in volcanic activity, the Leeward Antilles island arc occurs along the deformed southern edge of the Caribbean Plate and was formed by the plate's subduction under the South American Plate. Recent studies indicate that the Leeward Antilles are accreting to South America.

Islands 
The Leeward Antilles comprise (roughly from west to east):

 ABC islands (a part of the Kingdom of the Netherlands)
 Aruba, a constituent country of the Kingdom of the Netherlands
 Bonaire, a part of the Caribbean Netherlands (public body of the Netherlands proper)
 Curaçao, a constituent country of the Kingdom of the Netherlands

 Federal Dependencies of Venezuela
 La Blanquilla Island
 La Orchila Island
 La Sola Island
 La Tortuga Island
 Las Aves Archipelago
 Los Frailes Archipelago
 Los Hermanos Archipelago
 Los Monjes Archipelago
 Los Roques Archipelago
 Los Testigos Islands
 Patos Island

 State of Nueva Esparta (Venezuela)
 Coche Island
 Cubagua Island
 Margarita Island

Notes

References 
 Levander, Alan, et al. 2006 (28 February). Evolution of the Southern Caribbean Plate Boundary. (abstract; article) Eos, Transactions, American Geophysical Union, 87(9): 97,100.
 Levander, Alan, et al. 2006 (accessed 27 August).  Collaborative Research: Crust-Mantle Interactions During Continental Growth and High-Pressure Rock Exhumation at an Oblique Arc-Continent Collision Zone: Geology of Northeastern Venezuela. SE Caribbean Plate Boundary Continental Dynamics Project. Houston, TX: Rice University.

 
Archipelagoes of the Caribbean Sea